Paolo Dal Molin (born 31 July 1987) is an Italian athlete competing in the 110 metres hurdles. He competed at the 2020 Summer Olympics, in 110 m hurdles.

Biography

Born in Yaoundé, Cameroon, by Cameroonian mother and father from Belluno, Italy, he moved to Italy at the age of 10 years. He won two times his country's senior national championship and in 2013, at 3 February 2013, ranked at the 8th place in the IAAF world list.

National records
 60 metres hurdles: 7.51 ( Gothenburg, 1 March 2013) - Current holder
 110 m hurdles: 13.27 ( Rovereto, 26 June 2021) - Current holder

Achievements

Progression
110 m hs

60 m hs

National titles
Dal Molin won four national championships at individual senior level.

Italian Athletics Championships
110 metres hurdles: 2012, 2021 (2)
Italian Athletics Indoor Championships
60 metres hurdles: 2012, 2014 (2)

See also
 Italian records in athletics
 Italian all-time lists - 110 metres hurdles

Notes

References

External links
 

1987 births
Living people
Sportspeople from Yaoundé
Italian male hurdlers
Cameroonian male hurdlers
Citizens of Italy through descent
Italian people of Cameroonian descent
Cameroonian people of Italian descent
Italian sportspeople of African descent
Athletics competitors of Fiamme Oro
Italian Athletics Championships winners
Athletes (track and field) at the 2020 Summer Olympics
Olympic athletes of Italy